Alta Loma High School is a public high school located in Rancho Cucamonga, California, United States, and is part of the Chaffey Joint Union High School District.

History
With funding received from state bonds, expansion work was done between 1998–2001, adding on a new Math and Science building, a new dance studio, weight rooms, and a new library, along with renovation work on sites around the campus.

Academics
Alta Loma was a recipient of a Golden Ribbon Award from the California Department of Education in 2017  and a Silver Medalist for the U.S. News & World Report 2018 Best High Schools. Graduates from the Class of 2017 met the University of California A-G admission requirements at a rate of 66.2%.

Athletics 
Alta Loma is a member of the Palomares League of the CIF Southern Section. The school's football team plays its home games at Alta Loma's Uhalley Stadium.

Notable alumni

 Carlos Bocanegra (graduated 1997), professional soccer player and former USMNT captain
 David Castain, American entrepreneur and philanthropist
 Charles Castronovo (graduated 1993), tenor and opera singer
 Kenyon Coleman (graduated 1997), NFL football player
 Travis Coons, NFL football player
 Cameron Dunn (graduated 2001), professional soccer player who plays for Los Angeles Blues.
 Rocky Long (graduated 1968), college football coach, head coach at San Diego State
 Sid Monge (graduated 1970), retired Major League Baseball relief pitcher
 Adam Parada (graduated 1999), professional basketball player
 Nancy Raabe (graduated 1972, nee Miller), author, composer, clergy
 Eric Weddle (graduated 2003), former National Football League free safety
 Larri Merritt (graduated 2016), YouTuber and social media influencer

References

External links
Alta Loma High School
Chaffey Joint Union High School District

High schools in San Bernardino County, California
Education in Rancho Cucamonga, California
Public high schools in California
1963 establishments in California
Educational institutions established in 1963